Dad Savage is a 1998 British crime film directed by Betsan Morris Evans starring Patrick Stewart as the title character, a tulip plantation owner, quasi-legal entrepreneur and 'cowboy'. The film was tagged as 'a tale of untamed revenge.'

A jeep carrying Dad Savage (Patrick Stewart) and H (Kevin McKidd) crashes through the wall of a deserted farmhouse and lands in the cellar. Of the three people inside the house—Bob (Joe McFadden), Vic (Marc Warren), and Chris (Helen McCrory). Accusing the three of killing his son Sav (Jake Wood), Dad pulls a rifle on them and orders them to talk.

Cast 
 Patrick Stewart as Dad Savage
 Kevin McKidd  as H
 Helen McCrory  as Chris
 Joe McFadden  as Bob 
 Marc Warren  as Vic
 Jake Wood as Sav

External links 
 
 
 
 https://variety.com/1998/film/reviews/dad-savage-1200454067/
 http://www.tvguide.com/movies/dad-savage/review/133730/

1998 films
1998 crime films
British crime films
Films scored by Simon Boswell
1990s English-language films
1990s British films